The Sun Belt Conference men's soccer tournament is the conference championship tournament in soccer for the Sun Belt Conference (SBC).  The tournament was held from 1976 through 1995, when the sport was discontinued. The tournament resumed in 2014 when the conference reinstated men's soccer, and was discontinued again when the conference dropped men's soccer for the second time after the 2020–21 season. The SBC later announced that men's soccer would be reinstated again in 2022, and the tournament resumed at that time.

It is a single-elimination tournament involving the top eight teams in the SBC regular-season standings, with seeding based on record. Starting with the 2022 tournament, the quarterfinals and semifinals are hosted by the top two seeds, with the final being held at the home field of the top surviving seed.  The winner, declared conference champion, receives the conference's automatic bid to the NCAA Division I men's soccer championship.

Champions

Key

By year

Statistics

All-time champions 

Teams in bold are current SBC men's soccer members. Teams with a † no longer sponsor men's soccer.

References

External links